Osato is a Japanese word and may refer to:

Sono Osato (1919-2018), American actress and dancer
Ōsato, Miyagi, a town in Miyagi Prefecture, Japan
Osato, Saitama, a town in Saitama Prefecture, Japan
 Mr Osato, a fictional businessman and SPECTRE agent in the 1967 James Bond film You Only Live Twice